The 2017 Aegon Southsea Trophy was a professional tennis tournament played on outdoor grass courts. It was the first edition of the tournament and was part of the 2017 ITF Women's Circuit. It took place in Southsea, United Kingdom, on 26 June–2 July 2017.

Singles main draw entrants

Seeds 

 1 Rankings as of 19 June 2017.

Other entrants 
The following players received a wildcard into the singles main draw:
  Katie Boulter
  Laura Robson

Champions

Singles

 Tatjana Maria def.  Irina-Camelia Begu, 6–2, 6–2

Doubles
 
 Shuko Aoyama /  Yang Zhaoxuan def.  Viktorija Golubic /  Lyudmyla Kichenok, 6–7(7–9), 6–3, [10–8]

External links 
 2017 Aegon Southsea Trophy at ITFtennis.com
 Official website

2017 ITF Women's Circuit
2017 in English women's sport 
2017 in English tennis
Southsea Trophy